The Walton Street–Church Street Historic District in Baconton, Georgia is a  historic district that was listed on the National Register of Historic Places in 1983.  The listing included 17 contributing buildings.

It includes 15 houses constructed between 1900 and the 1930s, in styles including late Victorian Eclectic, Neo-classical, and Georgian styles, plus some influence of the Prairie School and the Craftsman movements.  Most are wood-frame buildings;  some have brick veneer. Thomas Jefferson Glausier, a builder, may be associated with some of the buildings.

It includes a turn-of-the-20th-century historic Methodist church, prominent on the corner of Walton Street and Church Street, and a brick school.

The east side of Baconton was developed on land formerly owned by George W. Jackson.  The George W. Jackson House stands at the former end of Walton Street, outside the district, and is separately listed on the National Register.

The district was one of three in Baconton listed on the National Register at the same time as the Jackson house, as part of a review of all historic resources in Baconton.

References

Historic districts on the National Register of Historic Places in Georgia (U.S. state)
Victorian architecture in Georgia (U.S. state)
Religious buildings and structures completed in 1900
National Register of Historic Places in Mitchell County, Georgia
Methodist churches in Georgia (U.S. state)